Ninety Percent of Everything: Inside Shipping, the Invisible Industry That Puts Clothes on Your Back, Gas in Your Car, And Food on Your Plate is a book by Rose George about the international shipping industry. In 2013 the 287 page book was published in New York City by Metropolitan Books, an imprint of Henry Holt and Company.

Critical reception 
Michael Causey, writing for the Washington Independent Review of Books, found the book to be an effective way to communicate the logistics of shipping, but found the final quarter of the book to be flawed. Dwight Garner, writing for The New York Times, found the book to be "consistently absorbing".

References

External links
 
 Author's book and website.

2013 non-fiction books
American non-fiction books
Books about globalization
Books of maritime history
Current affairs books
Metropolitan Books books